Benedict International Education Group (Bénédict) is a Swiss group with 80 schools worldwide.

History
Benedict International Education Group was formed in 1928 by Dr. Gaston Bénédict, a linguist and previous Professor at the University of Southern California. Professor Gaston Bénédict established his first school in Lausanne, Switzerland. The founder, Simon Bénédict (1873–1933), a French-Alsacian, opened, at the end of the nineteenth century, a first school in Egypt, followed later by a series of others in Switzerland. His son, Gaston (1900–1953), took over in 1928 and launched the Bénédict school movement in Lausanne. Giving business and language tuition to students of all ages, more than 40 establishments were in operation before the Second World War.

In November 2022, Benedict Zurich moved from Militärstrasse in Zurich's Kreis 4 to Vulkanstrasse 106 in Zurich Altstetten. At the same time, Benedict Schools Switzerland presented itself with a revised brand identity. Among other things, the accents aigus (é) in the company name were removed and the red of the logo was refreshed.

Schools

Schools in Switzerland
 Business and Hotel Management School - Switzerland - BHMS 
 4051 Basel, Steinenberg 19, Bénédict-Schule Basel
 3011 Bern, Aarbergergasse 5, M. H. Meister
 1201 Geneva, Rue Mme-de-Staël 7/9, M. E. Zurcher
 6900 Lugano, Via F. Pelli 14, Dr G. Lavelli
 6003 Luzern, Pilatusstrasse 6, M. H. Meister
 2000 Neuchâtel, Rue de l'Ecluse 38, Mme S. Gandolfo
 9001 St. Gallen, St-Leonhardstrasse 35, M. H. Meister
 8004 Zürich, Militärstrasse 106, M. H. Meister
 8401 Winterthur, Bahnhofplatz 3, M. J. Schürmann

Schools in Germany
 52062 Aachen, Wespienstrasse 4, Mme G. Steffens
 51465 Bergisch Gladbach, Kalkstr 37 - 41, M. Jan Patzer
 10365 Berlin, Schottstr. 6, M. K. Paykowski
 44787 Bochum, Herner Str. 45, M. K. Müller-Vélez
 46236 Bottrop, Pferdemarkt 4, M. O. Pierkes
 40233 Düsseldorf 1, Ackerstrasse 3, M. K. Paykowski
 51643 Gummersbach, Vollmerhauser Str. 30, Mme H. Keller
 59065 Hamm, Neue Bahnhofstr. 1-3, M. P. Usunov
 41836 Hückelhoven, Sophiastr. 38, Mme G. Steffens
 67655 Kaiserlautern, Fackelstr. 29, Mme A. Mattijs
 56068 Koblenz, Löhrstrasse 127, M. J. Wiesen
 50667 Köln, Albertusstr.47-49., Mme R. Kraus
 32423 Minden, Hausbergerstr. 4, Mme K. Goll
 41061 Mönchengladbach, Goebenstr. 6, Mme R. Welling-Arzdorf
 45468 Mülheim a.d. Ruhr, Leineweberstr. 21-25, M. R. Pankonin
 48143 Münster, Windthorststr. 15, Mme E. Lüdiger
 41460 Neuss, Marienkirchplatz 50, Mme R. Welling-Arzdorf
 49084 Osnabrück, Stahlwerksweg 10 B, Mme J. Mielke
 42853 Remscheid, Palmstr. 1, M. K.-H. Keller
 66111 Saarbrücken 3, Passagestr. 2-4, M. J. Wiesen
 70718 Stuttgart 1, Charlottenstr. 21 B, M. Ch. Ioannou
 42551 Velbert 1, Südstr. 38, M. K. Paykowski
 26382 Wilhelmshaven, Marktstrasse 60, M. W. Polanski
 42103 Wuppertal, Alte Freiheit 5, M. K. Paykowski

Schools in Ecuador
 Guayaquil, El Oro 804, Mme M. de Elizalde
 Quito, E. Chiriboga No. N47-133, Mme M. F. de Aguire

Schools in Spain
 35007 Las Palmas de Gran Canaria, Grau Bassas 27, M. J. L. Lagartos
 35100 Playa del Inglés, Edif. Mercurio 1, M. Rafaél Lagartos

Schools in Italy
 40121 Bologna, Via Nazario Sauro 1/2, Mmes A. & M.G. Zoffoli
 41012 Carpi, Corso A. Pio 68, M. Ph. Bernet
 16121 Genoa, Via XX Settembre 40, M. C. Simonini
 46100 Mantua, Via Chiassi 44, M. C. Simonini
 41037 Mirandola, Via Fulvia 67, M. C. Simonini
 41100 Modena, Via Emilia Est 435, M. C. Simonini
 80122 Naples, Via Crispi 32, Mme C. E. Clemente
 80038 Pomigliano, Piazza Primavera d'Arco, Mme C. E. Clemente
 42100 Reggio Emilia, Via Emilia San Pietro 19, Mme F. Menada
 17100 Savona, Via Nazario Sauro 1/5, Mme N. Barducci
 30124 Venice, San-Marco-Frezzeria 1688, Mme G. Marchi Pechy

Schools in Russia
 650099 Kemerovo, Sovetski Prospekt 69, Mme O. Klimenko
 630099 Novosibirsk, Ul. Sibirskaya 31, Mme S. V. Shabalina
 634050 Tomsk, Ul. Lenina 40, Mme N. Kovalenkou

References

External links
Benedict International Benedict addresses of all schools in the world

1928 establishments in Switzerland
Education companies of Europe
Education in Lausanne
Companies based in Lausanne
Service companies of Switzerland